Samson Against the Sheik (also known as Maciste Against the Sheik) is a 1962 Italian peplum film directed by Domenico Paolella.

In the late 1500s, forces of the Duke of Malaga topple the Sacred Obelisk in the North African city of Melida before they're defeated by the local Sheik. The Shiek's men then sail to Spain and kidnap the Duke's daughter, Isabella. Antonio, who loves Isabella, now travels to Melida with his friend, Maciste, to rescue her as well as her imprisoned father. They're soon captured and Maciste is forced to single-handedly re-erect the fallen obelisk before he and Antonio make their escape. The two men then seek to finish rescuing Isabella and restoring her father to his dukedom.

Cast 

Ed Fury: Samson/Maciste
Erno Crisa: Sheik
Gisella Arden: Isabella
Mara Berni: Zuleima
Giuseppe Addobbati: Duke of Malaga
Anna Ranalli: Consuelo
Piero Lulli: Ramiro
Massimo Carocci: Antonio
Carlo Pisacane: Alì
Bruno Scipioni: Luis
Nazzareno Zamperla: Fighter (uncredited)

See also 
Maciste against the Sheik (1926)

References

External links

1962 films
Films directed by Domenico Paolella
Films scored by Carlo Savina
Peplum films
1962 adventure films
Maciste films
Remakes of Italian films
Sound film remakes of silent films
Sword and sandal films
1960s Italian-language films
1960s Italian films